In English phonology, t-glottalization or t-glottalling''' is a sound change in certain English dialects and accents, particularly in the United Kingdom, that causes the phoneme  to be pronounced as the glottal stop  in certain positions.

As a sound change, it is a subtype of debuccalization. The pronunciation that it results in is called glottalization. Apparently, glottal reinforcement, which is quite common in English, is a stage preceding full replacement of the stop, and indeed, reinforcement and replacement can be in free variation.

History
The earliest mentions of the process are in Scotland during the 19th century, when Henry Sweet commented on the phenomenon. Peter Trudgill has argued that it began in Norfolk, based on studies of rural dialects of those born in the 1870s. The SED fieldworker Peter Wright found it in areas of Lancashire and said, "It is considered a lazy habit, but may have been in some dialects for hundreds of years."

Most early English dialectology focussed on rural areas, so it is hard to establish how long the process has existed in urban areas.  It has long been seen as a feature of Cockney dialect, and a 1955 study on Leeds dialect wrote that it occurred with "monotonous regularity" before consonants and often between vowel sounds.  David Crystal claims that the sound can be heard in Received Pronunciation (RP) speakers from the early 20th century such as Daniel Jones, Bertrand Russell and Ellen Terry. The Cambridge English Pronouncing Dictionary claims that t-glottalization is now most common in London, Leeds, Edinburgh, and Glasgow.

Uniquely for English in the West Indies, Barbadian English uses a glottal allophone for /t/, and also less frequently for /k/ and /p/.

Glottal reinforcement (pre-glottalization)

pre-consonantal: get some             lightning               at last     
final (pre-pausal): wait                 bat                          about       

The glottal closure overlaps with the consonant that it precedes, but the articulatory movements involved can usually be observed only by using laboratory instruments. In words such as 'eaten' and 'button', pronounced with a glottal closure, it is generally almost impossible to know whether the  has been pronounced (e.g.) or omitted (e.g.).

However, in the same syllable coda position, /t/ may instead be analyzed as an unreleased stop.

In some accents of English,  may be pre-glottalized intervocalically if it occurs finally in a stressed syllable. In the north-east of England and East Anglia, pronunciations such as 'paper' , 'happy'  are found.

There is variation in the occurrence of glottalization within RP according to which consonant follows : for example, some speakers do not glottalize  when  follows, in words such as 'petrol' /ˈpɛtrəl/, 'mattress' /ˈmætrəs/.

T-glottalization rarely occurs syllable-initially in English but has been reported in some words that begin  in some northern dialects.Docherty, Foulkes, Milroy, Milroy and Walshaw (1997) Descriptive adequacy in phonology in Journal of Linguistics 33, p. 290

Glottal replacement

This replacement also happens before a syllabic , as in button (representable as ) and some pronunciations of pattern (representable as ).

It is most common between a stressed vowel and a reduced vowel:
 getting better  (in GA, this is );
 societies , detail  (these are slightly less likely to be glottalized).

In both RP and GA, -replacement is found in absolute final position:
 let's start 
 what  or 
 foot T-glottalization is believed to have been spreading in Southern England at a faster rate than th-fronting. (GB is his alternative term for RP). The increased use of glottal stops within RP is believed to be an influence from Cockney and other working-class urban speech. In a 1985 publication on the speech of West Yorkshire, KM Petyt found that t-glottalization was spreading from Bradford (where it had been reported in traditional dialect) to Halifax and Huddersfield (where it had not been reported in traditional dialect). In 1999, Shorrocks noted the phenomenon amongst young people in Bolton, Greater Manchester: "It is not at all typical of the traditional vernacular, in contradistinction to some other varieties of English, but younger people use  medially between vowels more than their elders."

Recent studies (Milroy, Milroy & Walshaw 1994, Fabricius 2000) have suggested that t-glottalization is increasing in RP speech.  Prince Harry frequently glottalizes his ts.  One study carried out by Anne Fabricius suggests that t-glottalization is increasing in RP, the reason for this being the dialect levelling of the Southeast. She has argued that a wave-like profile of t-glottalization has been going on through the regions, which has begun with speakers in London, due to the influence of Cockney. She says that this development is due to the population size of the capital, as well as London's dominance of the Southeast of England.  However, Miroslav Ježek has argued that linguists attribute changes to London too readily, and that the evidence suggests that t-glottalization began in Scotland and worked its way down gradually to London.

 North American dialects 
While appearance is generally more restricted than Cockney, American and Canadian English accents feature t-glottalization, heard in the following contexts:

 Word finally or before a syllabic /n/
 Latin [læʔn̩],
 Cat [kæʔ]
 (Less commonly) across word boundaries.
 "Right ankle" [raɪʔ‿æŋkəl]
 "That apple" [ðæʔ‿æpəl]T-glottalization, especially at word boundaries, is considered both a geographic and sociolinguistic phenomenon, with rates increasing both in the western U.S. and in younger female speakers. On the west coast t''-glottalization, presumably due to its primarily female occurrence, has become stigmatized by association with the stigma of the Valley Girl accent. Many younger educated speakers pronounce syballic /n/ as an unstressed vowel followed by a consonant [ən~ɪn] and will pronounce it as an alveolar tap [ɾ] instead.

See also
 Glottalization
 Regional accents of English speakers
 Unreleased stop

References

English phonology